The Pas is a town in Manitoba, Canada, located at the confluence of the Pasquia River and the Saskatchewan River and surrounded by the unorganized Northern Region of the province. It is sometimes still called Paskoyac by locals after the first trading post, called Fort Paskoya and constructed during French colonial rule. The Pasquia River begins in the Pasquia Hills in east central Saskatchewan. The French in 1795 knew the river as Basquiau.

Known as "The Gateway to the North", The Pas is a multi-industry northern Manitoba town serving the surrounding region. The main components of the region's economy are agriculture, forestry, commercial fishing, tourism, transportation, and services (especially health and education). The main employer is a paper mill operated by Canadian Kraft Paper Industries Ltd. The Pas contains one of the two main campuses of the University College of the North.

The Pas is bordered by the Rural Municipality of Kelsey, as well as part of the Opaskwayak Cree Nation.

History 

The area's original inhabitants were the Swampy Cree. Their ancestors are thought to have migrated from the southeastern prairies over 9000 years ago.

The first European recorded to encounter the Cree was Henry Kelsey, an employee of the Hudson's Bay Company. He travelled through the area between 1690 and 1692 on his way to the Canadian prairies.

During the years of New France, La Vérendrye, the first western military commander, directed the construction of Fort Paskoya near here. It was named after the people of the Pasquia River. For years the settlement was called Pascoyac, sometimes shortened to Le Pas.

In 1904, The Pas Indian Band set up a sawmill on Mission Island in the Saskatchewan River. Soon after, the band surrendered their reserve lands south of the river, including the areas around the site of the Hudson's Bay Company trading post and the Anglican Church Mission to make way for the Hudson Bay Railway and development of the Town of The Pas.

By 1908, the band reopened their sawmill north of the river, and in 1912, the Town of The Pas was incorporated and The Pas Indian Band changed its name to Opaskwayak Cree Nation.

Between 1906 and 1910, Herman Finger setup the Finger Lumber Company in the area, and created a village called Fingerville for the company's workers. When the Town of The Pas was created in 1912, Fingerville was absorbed into The Pas, and Herman Finger became The Pas's first mayor.

Also in 1912, the community was transferred from Keewatin (a district of the Northwest Territories) to Manitoba as part of the Manitoba Boundaries Extension Act.

The area today is composed of three distinct communities: the Town of The Pas, the Opaskwayak Cree Nation, and the Rural Municipality of Kelsey.

The history of the town and the region may be seen at the Sam Waller Museum, located in the old courthouse in downtown The Pas.

Demographics 

According to the 2011 National Household Survey, the composition of its population was Aboriginals (46.2%): First Nations (26.4%) and Metis (19.8%); and white (51.3%). The visible minority population was 2.1%. The religious make up of The Pas is; Christian (67.2%), non-religious (30.2%), and the remaining 2.6% fall into another religion. Most of the residents are Canadian citizens (99.3%). About 10.3% of the population can speak a language that is not recognized as an official language of Canada. Aboriginal languages are the most common spoken non-official language (5.6%).

The median age in The Pas is 34.1 years old. Age groups are: 9 and younger (16.2%), 10 to 19 (14.7%), 20s (13.6%), 30s (13.6%), 40s (13.1%), 50 to 64 (18.5%), and more than 65 (10.2%).

The unemployment rate in The Pas (in 2011) was 7.3%.

Educational attainment (in 2011): No certificate 30.2%; High school certificate 22.4%; College 21.6%; Apprenticeship 10.6%; University certificate 10.6%; University certificate (below bachelor) 4.5%.

The marital status of all those aged over 15 is: married or living with common-law partner (52.9%); never been married (32.3%); divorced or separated (8.8%); widowed (5.7%).

There are 2,324 private dwellings in The Pas, most of them being occupied (94.1%). The average number of people per household is 2.5.

Culture 
Farley Mowat's Lost in the Barrens, published in 1956, is the first of two children/young adults novels that are set in The Pas. The story begins at a remote trapping lodge, and then moves into the Canadian "barren lands" further north. The Pas is the main trading centre to which the book's protagonists travel to stock up on provisions and supplies to take back to their homes in the bush. In Canada and elsewhere, the book is used as part of school reading. The book's sequel, Curse of the Viking Grave, makes mention of The Pas.

The Pas is the site of the Northern Manitoba Trappers' Festival, which is Manitoba's oldest festival and one of Canada's oldest winter festivals. It has been held every year since 1948 and features winter activities including ice fishing, muskrat skinning, and an annual sled dog race, which is part of the International Federation of Sleddog Sports.

A 1991 CBC movie, Conspiracy of Silence, is based on the 1971 murder of Helen Betty Osborne in The Pas.

Climate 
The Pas experiences a humid continental climate (Köppen Dfb) with long cold winters and short warm summers.

Sports 
The OCN Blizzard, hockey team, competes in the Manitoba Junior Hockey League. The Pas is also home to the OCN Storm of the Keystone Junior Hockey League, the Huskies minor hockey league, and the MBCI Spartans who compete in Zone 11 of the MHSAA. The Intermediate 'A' version of The Pas Huskies won the 1968-69 Manitoba championship.

The son of former Husky star defenceman Jack Giles, Curt Giles, had a career in the NHL with New York Rangers, St. Louis, and Minnesota. The Pas native Murray Anderson was the first known locally born player to make the NHL, with Washington Capitals in the 1970s. Warren Harrison, younger brother of ex-Husky Roger Harrison, was drafted 53rd overall by the Oakland Seals in the 1969 NHL amateur draft.

The Pas Teepees were baseball champions in the Polar League in 1959. The team included several members of the Huskies, and were inducted into the Manitoba Sports Hall of Fame in 2005.

Government 
The Pas is governed by a mayor and six councilors who are elected by residents.  The mayor is Andre Murphy.

The region is represented in the Legislative Assembly of Manitoba as part of The Pas riding. The riding is held by New Democratic Party (NDP) Member of the Legislative Assembly Amanda Lathlin. First elected in a by-election on April 22, 2015, she is the daughter of Oscar Lathlin who had held the riding from 1990 until his death in November 2008. She is the first First Nations woman ever elected to the provincial legislature.

In the House of Commons of Canada, The Pas is part of the Churchill—Keewatinook Aski riding, held by NDP Member of Parliament Niki Ashton.

Education 
The Pas' public school system is the Kelsey School Division, which consists of two elementary schools (Kelsey Community School and Opasquia School), one middle school (Scott Bateman Middle School), one alternate program and adult learning Centre (Mary Duncan School) and one high school (Margaret Barbour Collegiate Institute)

There is also a K-6 school (Joe A. Ross) and a junior high/high school (Oscar Lathlin Collegiate) located on the Opaskwayak Cree Nation.

The town hosts the main campus of the University College of the North.

Media 
Radio
 AM 1240: CJAR, adult contemporary
 FM 92.7: CITP-FM, First Nations community radio
 FM 93.7: CKSB-3-FM, Première Chaîne (repeats CKSB Winnipeg)
 FM 94.5: CBWJ-FM, CBC Radio One (repeats CBWK-FM Thompson)

Television

CBWIT first went on the air in June, 1962 as CBWBT-1. The station broadcast kinescope recordings sent to the transmitter from CBWT. On March 1, 1969, the province-wide microwave system replaced the kinescope recordings, and The Pas has enjoyed live television since then.

All stations serving The Pas are repeaters of Winnipeg-based stations.
 CBWFT-1 Channel 6 (Radio-Canada)
 CBWIT Channel 7 (CBC)
 CKYP-TV Channel 12 (CTV)

Shaw Communications is the local cable television provider serving The Pas, and operates the local Shaw TV channel on cable channel 11.

Newspapers
 Opasquia Times

Notable people

Henry Budd, Anglican priest
Parker Burrell, politician
Albert Campbell (dogsled racer), dog sleder
Pat Carey (musician), musician
John Carroll (Manitoba politician), politician
Ovide Charlebois, vicar
Connor Dewar, hockey player
Herman Finger, politician
Curt Giles, hockey player
Brian Goudie, hockey player
Glen Gulutzan, hockey coach
Owen Hughes (politician), politician
John Ingebrigtson, politician
Amanda Lathlin, politician
Oscar Lathlin, politician
Bif Naked, musician
Robert Orok, politician
Helen Betty Osborne, murder victim
Walt Peacosh, hockey player
Roddy Piper, wrestler
W. B. Scarth, politician
James Settee, Anglican priest
Ernest J. Smith, architect
Chelsea Stewart, soccer player
Bernard Munroe Stitt, politician
Emile St. Godard, dog sleder

See also 
The Pas railway station
Hudson Bay Railway

References

External links 

Town of The Pas website

 
1912 establishments in Manitoba
Hudson's Bay Company trading posts
Logging communities in Canada
Towns in Manitoba
Populated places on the Saskatchewan River